The 1934 United States House of Representatives elections in Virginia were held on November 6, 1934 to determine who will represent the Commonwealth of Virginia in the United States House of Representatives. Virginia had nine seats in the House, apportioned according to the 1930 United States Census. Representatives are elected for two-year terms. This election was notable for the state's return to electoral district voting after briefly experimenting with electing all Representatives at-large in the previous election.

Overview

References

See also
 United States House elections, 1934

Virginia
1934
1934 Virginia elections